Melieria nigritarsoides is a species of ulidiid or picture-winged fly in the genus Melieria of the family Tephritidae.

References

nigritarsoides